The 1985 Miami Hurricanes baseball team represented the University of Miami in the 1985 NCAA Division I baseball season. The team was coached by Ron Fraser in his 23rd season.

The Hurricanes won the College World Series, defeating the Texas Longhorns in the championship game.

Roster

Schedule 

! style="background:#F47320;color:#004F2F;"| Regular Season
|- 

|- align="center" bgcolor="ddffdd"
| February 1 ||  || Mark Light Field || 14–5 || 1–0
|- align="center" bgcolor="ddffdd"
| February 2 || South Alabama || Mark Light Field || 12–9 || 2–0
|- align="center" bgcolor="ffdddd"
| February 3 || South Alabama || Mark Light Field || 5–7 || 2–1
|- align="center" bgcolor="ffdddd"
| February 5 || at  || Red McEwen Field || 3–4 || 2–2
|- align="center" bgcolor="ddffdd"
| February 9 ||  || Mark Light Field || 5–2 || 3–2
|- align="center" bgcolor="ddffdd"
| February 9 || Arkansas || Mark Light Field || 2–1 || 4–2
|- align="center" bgcolor="ddffdd"
| February 10 || Arkansas || Mark Light Field || 4–0 || 5–2
|- align="center" bgcolor="ddffdd"
| February 12 ||  || Mark Light Field || 14–7 || 6–2
|- align="center" bgcolor="ddffdd"
| February 13 || Armstrong State || Mark Light Field || 15–3 || 7–2
|- align="center" bgcolor="ddffdd"
| February 15 ||  || Mark Light Field || 5–2 || 8–2
|- align="center" bgcolor="ffdddd"
| February 16 || Florida || Mark Light Field || 2–4 || 8–3
|- align="center" bgcolor="ddffdd"
| February 17 || Florida || Mark Light Field || 5–2 || 9–3
|- align="center" bgcolor="ddffdd"
| February 18 ||  || Mark Light Field || 9–4 || 10–3
|- align="center" bgcolor="ffdddd"
| February 20 ||  || Mark Light Field || 1–4 || 10–4
|- align="center" bgcolor="ffdddd"
| February 22 ||  || Mark Light Field || 2–5 || 10–5
|- align="center" bgcolor="ddffdd"
| February 23 || Florida State || Mark Light Field || 15–4 || 11–5
|- align="center" bgcolor="ddffdd"
| February 24 || Florida State || Mark Light Field || 6–5 || 12–5
|- align="center" bgcolor="ddffdd"
| February 27 ||  || Mark Light Field || 17–4 || 13–5
|- align="center" bgcolor="ddffdd"
| February 28 ||  || Mark Light Field || 8–6 || 14–5
|-

|- align="center" bgcolor="ddffdd"
| March 1 || New Orleans || Mark Light Field || 10–0 || 15–5
|- align="center" bgcolor="ddffdd"
| March 2 || New Orleans || Mark Light Field || 8–3 || 16–5
|- align="center" bgcolor="ddffdd"
| March 3 || New Orleans || Mark Light Field || 5–3 || 17–5
|- align="center" bgcolor="ddffdd"
| March 5 ||  || Mark Light Field || 7–3 || 18–5
|- align="center" bgcolor="ddffdd"
| March 5 || Rice || Mark Light Field || 11–3 || 19–5
|- align="center" bgcolor="ddffdd"
| March 8 ||  || Mark Light Field || 10–1 || 20–5
|- align="center" bgcolor="ddffdd"
| March 9 || Maine || Mark Light Field || 9–3 || 21–5
|- align="center" bgcolor="ddffdd"
| March 10 ||  || Mark Light Field || 3–2 || 22–5
|- align="center" bgcolor="ddffdd"
| March 12 ||  || Mark Light Field || 6–5 || 23–5
|- align="center" bgcolor="ddffdd"
| March 13 || Creighton || Mark Light Field || 14–7 || 24–5
|- align="center" bgcolor="ddffdd"
| March 14 ||  || Mark Light Field || 12–4 || 25–5
|- align="center" bgcolor="ddffdd"
| March 15 || Southern Illinois || Mark Light Field || 2–0 || 26–5
|- align="center" bgcolor="ddffdd"
| March 16 || Southern Illinois || Mark Light Field || 7–6 || 27–5
|- align="center" bgcolor="ddffdd"
| March 17 ||  || Mark Light Field || 9–3 || 28–5
|- align="center" bgcolor="ddffdd"
| March 18 ||  || Mark Light Field || 14–2 || 29–5
|- align="center" bgcolor="ddffdd"
| March 19 ||  || Mark Light Field || 11–3 || 30–5
|- align="center" bgcolor="ddffdd"
| March 20 || Maine || Mark Light Field || 5–3 || 31–5
|- align="center" bgcolor="ddffdd"
| March 22 || Michigan State || Mark Light Field || 18–5 || 32–5
|- align="center" bgcolor="ddffdd"
| March 23 || Mercer || Mark Light Field || 5–1 || 33–5
|- align="center" bgcolor="ddffdd"
| March 23 || Maine || Mark Light Field || 9–4 || 34–5
|- align="center" bgcolor="ffdddd"
| March 24 || Maine || Mark Light Field || 2–3 || 34–6
|- align="center" bgcolor="ddffdd"
| March 27 || Michigan State|| Mark Light Field || 6–3 || 35–6
|- align="center" bgcolor="ddffdd"
| March 29 || Michigan State|| Mark Light Field || 5–1 || 36–6
|- align="center" bgcolor="ffdddd"
| March 30 || Michigan State|| Mark Light Field || 6–7 || 36–7
|-

|- align="center" bgcolor="ddffdd"
| April 3 ||  || Mark Light Field || 6–2 || 37–7
|- align="center" bgcolor="ddffdd"
| April 5 || vs.  || All Sports Stadium || 11–1 || 38–7
|- align="center" bgcolor="ffdddd"
| April 6 || vs.  || All Sports Stadium || 1–7 || 38–8
|- align="center" bgcolor="ddffdd"
| April 6 || vs.  || All Sports Stadium || 6–3 || 39–8
|- align="center" bgcolor="ddffdd"
| April 7 || vs. Southern California || All Sports Stadium || 8–6 || 40–8
|- align="center" bgcolor="ddffdd"
| April 9 ||  || Mark Light Field || 12–1 || 41–8
|- align="center" bgcolor="ddffdd"
| April 10 ||  || Mark Light Field || 6–3 || 42–8
|- align="center" bgcolor="ddffdd"
| April 12 || at Florida State || Seminole Stadium || 3–2 || 43–8
|- align="center" bgcolor="ffdddd"
| April 13 || at Florida State || Seminole Stadium || 5–13 || 43–9
|- align="center" bgcolor="ddffdd"
| April 14 || at Florida State || Seminole Stadium || 8–5 || 44–9
|- align="center" bgcolor="ddffdd"
| April 16 || Barry || Mark Light Field || 5–0 || 45–9
|- align="center" bgcolor="ddffdd"
| April 17 || at Florida International || || 4–3 || 46–9
|- align="center" bgcolor="ddffdd"
| April 19 || at Florida|| Perry Field || 11–0 || 47–9
|- align="center" bgcolor="ddffdd"
| April 20 || at Florida|| Perry Field || 6–4 || 48–9
|- align="center" bgcolor="ddffdd"
| April 24 || Florida Atlantic || Mark Light Stadium || 11–3 || 49–9
|- align="center" bgcolor="ddffdd"
| April 29 || at  || Conrad Park || 12–10 || 50–9
|- align="center" bgcolor="ffdddd"
| April 30 || at Stetson || Conrad Park || 2–13 || 50–10
|- align="center" bgcolor="ddffdd"
| April 30 || at Stetson || Conrad Park || 4–3 || 51–10
|-

|- align="center" bgcolor="ddffdd"
| May 3 || at  || Sewell–Thomas Stadium || 14–10 || 52–10
|- align="center" bgcolor="ffdddd"
| May 4 || at Alabama || Sewell–Thomas Stadium || 6–12 || 52–11
|- align="center" bgcolor="ffdddd"
| May 5 || at Alabama || Sewell–Thomas Stadium || 7–11 || 52–12
|- align="center" bgcolor="ffdddd"
| May 11 ||  || Mark Light Field || 6–7 || 52–13
|- align="center" bgcolor="ddffdd"
| May 12 || Central Florida || Mark Light Field || 18–5 || 53–13
|- align="center" bgcolor="ddffdd"
| May 12 || Central Florida || Mark Light Field || 28–5 || 54–13
|- align="center" bgcolor="ddffdd"
| May 17 ||  || Mark Light Field || 9–0 || 55–13
|- align="center" bgcolor="ffdddd"
| May 18 || South Florida || Mark Light Field || 1–2 || 55–14
|- align="center" bgcolor="ddffdd"
| May 19 || South Florida || Mark Light Field || 8–3 || 56–14
|-

|-
! style="background:#F47320;color:#004F2F;"| Post–Season
|-

|- align="center" bgcolor="ddffdd"
| May 24 || vs.  || Mark Light Field || 22–6 || 57–14
|- align="center" bgcolor="ddffdd"
| May 26 || vs.  || Mark Light Field || 11–6 || 58–14
|- align="center" bgcolor="ffdddd"
| May 27 || vs. Florida || Mark Light Field || 1–8 || 58–15
|- align="center" bgcolor="ddffdd"
| May 28 || vs. Florida || Mark Light Field || 12–9 || 59–15
|-

|- align="center" bgcolor="ddffdd"
| June 1 || vs. Stanford || Rosenblatt Stadium || 17–3 || 60–15
|- align="center" bgcolor="ffdddd"
| June 5 || vs. Texas || Rosenblatt Stadium || 4–8 || 61–16
|- align="center" bgcolor="ddffdd"
| June 6 || vs. Oklahoma State || Rosenblatt Stadium || 2–1 || 61–16
|- align="center" bgcolor="ddffdd"
| June 8 || vs.  || Rosenblatt Stadium || 6–5 || 62–16
|- align="center" bgcolor="ddffdd"
| June 9 || vs. Texas || Rosenblatt Stadium || 2–1 || 63–16
|- align="center" bgcolor="ddffdd"
| June 11 || vs. Texas || Rosenblatt Stadium || 10–6 || 64–16
|-

Awards and honors 
Greg Ellena
 College World Series Most Outstanding Player

Mike Fiore
 Freshman All-America

Chris Magno
 College World Series All-Tournament Team

Rick Raether
 All-America First Team

Kevin Sheary
 College World Series All-Tournament Team

Hurricanes in the 1985 MLB Draft 
The following members of the Miami baseball program were drafted in the 1985 Major League Baseball Draft.

References 

Miami Hurricanes
Miami Hurricanes baseball seasons
College World Series seasons
NCAA Division I Baseball Championship seasons
Miami Hurricanes baseball team